The Hammer Series is a series of cycling races organised by Velon in which teams compete against each other to determine the winning formation, instead of individual riders. The races are part of the UCI Asia Tour or UCI Europe Tour in category 2.1 or 1.1. The races consist of three days, with each posing a separate challenge, sprint, climb and Team Time Trial chase. The races are organised by Velon.

The name Hammer refers to a pro cycling term “Drop the Hammer”, which is the moment when a rider decides to make a break away from his rivals.

Controversies

Velon's complaint against the UCI
Velon is a cycling media organisation created in 2014 by 11 World Tour teams. The organisation develop media content that is not often available via the UCI. Velon launched the Hammer Series in 2017. On 20 September 2019, Velon, with the unanimous support of its shareholders, submitted an anti-trust Complaint to the European Commission against the Union Cycliste Internationale (UCI) based on Articles 101 and 102 TFEU.

The complaint taken to the European Commission was over two issues. The first issue is the use of the word “series” in Velon’s Hammer Series.

Amidst their legal battle with the UCI, Velon decided to suspend their 2020 races as they claimed that the UCI was trying to torpedo the race series. Before the cancellation, Velon had planned on expanding the series, including a new event that was to be held in February in Pereira, Colombia that featured both men's and women's races.

Winners

References

External links

Cycle races in the Netherlands
Recurring sporting events established in 2017
UCI Europe Tour races